The Standing Committee on Local Government and Public Administration is a standing committee of the Parliament of Norway. It is responsible for policies relating to local government, regional and rural policy, immigration policy, housing policy, building and construction, national minorities, Sami issues, matters relating to the organization and operation of state administration, government administration, personnel policy for state employees including pay and pensions, and economic support for political parties. It corresponds to the Ministry of Local Government and Regional Development and Ministry of Government Administration and Reform. The committee has 15 members and is chaired by Helge André Njåstad of the Progress Party.

Members 2013–17

References

Standing committees of the Storting